The 6th Vietnam Film Festival was held from April 22 to April 29, 1983 in Ho Chi Minh City, Vietnam with the slogan: "For the Socialist Fatherland, for the people's happiness, for the development of the national cinema" (Vietnamese: "Vì Tổ quốc xã hội chủ nghĩa, vì hạnh phúc của nhân dân, vì sự phát triển của nền điện ảnh dân tộc").

Event 
With 100 films participating in the Film Festival, 8 Golden Lotuses were awarded in the categories: Feature film (2 films), Documentary film (4 films), Animated film (3 films).

The jury are representatives in both film and literature fields with names such as Chế Lan Viên, Nguyễn Khải, Hoàng Trung Thông, Phạm Kỳ Nam, Trần Vũ, etc.

Awards

Feature film

Documentary/Science film

Children/Animated film

Notes

References 

Vietnam Film Festival
Vietnam Film Festival
1983 in Vietnam